Sándor Prokopp (7 May 1887 – 4 November 1964) was a Hungarian sport shooter who competed for Hungary at the 1908, 1912 and the 1924 Summer Olympics. He was born in Kassa, Kingdom of Hungary (today Košice, Slovakia) and died in Budapest.

1908 London

In 1908 he finished 43rd in the 300 metre free rifle competition.

1912 Stockholm

Four years later he won the gold medal in the 300 metre military rifle, three positions event.

1924 Paris

In the 1924 Summer Olympics he participated in the following events:

 25 metre rapid fire pistol - 53rd place
 600 metre free rifle - 55th place
 Team free rifle - unplaced (team incomplete)

References

External links
 profile

1887 births
1964 deaths
Sportspeople from Košice
Hungarian male sport shooters
ISSF rifle shooters
ISSF pistol shooters
Olympic shooters of Hungary
Shooters at the 1908 Summer Olympics
Shooters at the 1912 Summer Olympics
Shooters at the 1924 Summer Olympics
Olympic gold medalists for Hungary
Olympic medalists in shooting
Medalists at the 1912 Summer Olympics